The English rock band Cardiacs have released five studio albums and two extended plays along with a number of singles, compilations, live albums and demos. The group was formed by brothers Tim and Jim Smith in 1977 under the name Cardiac Arrest, releasing their debut single "A Bus for a Bus on the Bus" in 1979 and the demo album The Obvious Identity the following year. After being renamed to Cardiacs, the band released two more cassettes, Toy World (1981) and The Seaside (1984).

1987's Big Ship EP acted as Cardiacs' first proper recording, released on their independent label The Alphabet Business Concern on which they would release all future albums. Their debut studio album proper, A Little Man and a House and the Whole World Window (1988) found commercial success with its single, "Is This the Life?" which peaked at number 80 the UK Singles Chart. The band's second studio album, On Land and in the Sea (1989), released to weak sales in comparison to its predecessor, but was critically praised.

Cardiacs' third studio album, Heaven Born and Ever Bright, was released on 15 May 1992. Due to Rough Trade's bankruptcy, the album was a commercial failure. Sing to God, the band's fourth studio album, was released on 11 June 1996. It was initially poorly received, but has since been remembered as one of their greatest projects.

Guns (1999) was released as the band's fifth studio album which produced the single "Signs". Preceded by the release of "Ditzy Scene", the band's sixth studio album LSD has yet to be released. 2020 saw the official release of the song "Vermin Mangle" to mark the funeral of Tim Smith.

Albums

Studio albums

Compilation albums

Live albums

Demo albums

Video albums

Extended plays

Singles

References

External links 

 Cardiacs on Bandcamp
 Cardiacs discography at AllMusic
 Cardiacs on Discogs

Rock music group discographies
Discography